Vittorio Storaro, A.S.C., A.I.C. (born 24 June 1940), is an Italian cinematographer widely recognized as one of the best and most influential in cinema history, for his work on numerous classic films including The Conformist, Apocalypse Now, and The Last Emperor. In the course of over fifty years, he has collaborated with directors such as Bernardo Bertolucci, Francis Ford Coppola, Warren Beatty, Woody Allen and Carlos Saura.

He has received three Academy Awards for Best Cinematography for the films Apocalypse Now (1979), Reds (1981), and The Last Emperor (1987), and is one of three living persons who has won the award three times, the others being Robert Richardson and Emmanuel Lubezki.

Early life

Storaro was born in Rome. The son of a film projectionist, Storaro began studying photography at the age of 11. He went on to formal cinematography studies at the national Italian film school, Centro Sperimentale di Cinematografia, when he was 18.

Career
Storaro is considered to be one of the greatest and most influential cinematographers of all time. He has worked with many important film directors, in particular Bernardo Bertolucci, with whom he has had a long collaboration. His philosophy is largely inspired by Johann Wolfgang von Goethe's theory of colors, which focuses in part on the psychological effects that different colors have and the way in which colors influence our perceptions of different situations.

He first worked with Bertolucci on The Conformist (1970). Set in fascist Italy, the film has been described as a "visual masterpiece".

Also in 1970, he photographed The Bird with the Crystal Plumage, the directorial debut of Dario Argento and a landmark film in the giallo genre.

The first American film that Storaro worked on was Apocalypse Now (1979). Director Francis Ford Coppola gave him free rein on the film's visual look. Apocalypse Now earned Storaro his first Academy Award.

He worked with Warren Beatty for the first time on Reds (1981), and ended up winning his second Academy Award.

Storaro won a third Academy Award for The Last Emperor (1987), directed by Bertolucci. Three years later he received a nomination, but did not win, for the Beatty film Dick Tracy.

In 2002, Storaro completed the first in a series of books that articulate his philosophy of cinematography.

He was the cinematographer for a BBC co-production with Italian broadcaster RAI of Verdi's Rigoletto over two nights on the weekend of 4 and 5 September 2010.

Woody Allen's Café Society (2016) was the first film that Storaro shot digitally; he used the Sony F65 camera.

In 2017, Storaro was honored with the George Eastman Award. The same year he also attended the New York Film Festival at which he debated with Ed Lachman on cinematography and its transition to digital.

His other film credits include 1900, Last Tango in Paris, Dominion: Prequel to the Exorcist, One from the Heart, Bulworth, The Sheltering Sky, Tucker: The Man and His Dream, Ladyhawke, Tango, and Goya en Burdeos.

With his son Fabrizio, he created the Univisium format system to unify all future theatrical and television movies into one respective aspect ratio of 2.00:1. As of 2020, this unification has not happened, and the universal replacement of 4:3 televisions by large, wide-screen displays greatly reduces the need to modify scope-ratio films for home theater presentation.

Personal life
Storaro is known for stylish, fastidious, and flamboyant personal fashion. Francis Ford Coppola once noted, "Vittorio is the only man I ever knew that could fall off a ladder in a white suit, into the mud, and not get dirty."

Filmography

Selected credits:

Awards and nominations 
Academy Awards

British Academy Film Awards

Primetime Emmy Awards

Cannes Film Festival

American Society of Cinematographers 

International Film Festival of India

References

Further reading
Masters of Light - Conversations with cinematographers (1984) Schaefer, S & Salvato, L.,  
Writer of Light: The Cinematography of Vittorio Storaro, ASC, AIC (2000) Zone, R., 
Vittorio Storaro: Writing with Light: Volume 1: The Light (2002) Storaro, V.,

External links

International Cinematographers Guild Interview 
Vittorio Storaro Website (Italian or English)

1940 births
Living people
Best Cinematographer Academy Award winners
Best Cinematography BAFTA Award winners
Centro Sperimentale di Cinematografia alumni
David di Donatello winners
Ciak d'oro winners
European Film Award for Best Cinematographer winners
Italian cinematographers
Film people from Rome